Jong Chien-wu is a Taiwanese football (soccer) manager. He has managed Lukuang football team, Chinese Taipei national futsal team, etc. He is now Chinese Taipei Football Association's deputy general secretary.

Managerial history 
 1984 - Taipei Jingwen High School football team
 1991 - Lukuang football team
 2002 - Chinese Taipei national futsal team

References

Living people
Taiwanese football managers
Year of birth missing (living people)